Fatah Halab, or Aleppo Conquest, was a joint operations room of Syrian rebel factions operating in and around Aleppo, Syria. Succeeding the Aleppo Liberation operations room, its establishment was announced on 26 April 2015. It stated that its aim was to conquer Aleppo City from Syrian government forces.

In an October 2015 publication, the Washington D.C.-based Institute for the Study of War considered Aleppo Conquest as one of the "powerbrokers" in Aleppo Governorate, being both "anti-regime" and "anti-ISIS."

Since the inter-rebel conflicts, defections and mergers which started in December 2016, Fatah Halab has become largely defunct.

Member groups

The operations room included both US-backed groups and Sunni Islamist groups. It included some groups which also participated in the Sunni Islamist Ansar al-Sharia operations room, but not others, such as al-Nusra Front. Previously al-Nusra coordinated with other groups through the Aleppo Operations Room.

Fatah Halab was originally established by 7 major Sunni Islamist groups on 26 April 2015:
 Levant Front
 Ahrar al-Sham
 Sham Legion
 Levant Revolutionaries Battalions
 Army of Islam
 Fastaqim Union
 Dawn of Caliphate Battalions

The number of groups in Fatah Halab increased after its founding, and by 18 June 2015 there were 31 groups.

 there were around 8,000 fighters spread out over a myriad of groups of varying sized. The following were the largest groups that participate in the operations room.

 1st Regiment
 Liberation Army
 46th Division
 Ahrar al-Sham
 Levant Front
 Army of Mujahideen
 Atarib Martyrs Brigade
 Levant Revolutionaries Battalions
 Banners of Islam Movement
 Authenticity and Development Front
 Fastaqim Union (mostly defunct since November 2016)
 Nour al-Din al-Zenki Movement (until October 2016)
 Sham Legion
 Sultan Murad Division
 Sultan Mehmed the Conqueror Brigade
 Free Idlib Army
 Mountain Hawks Brigade
 Northern Division
 13th Division
 101st Infantry Division
 Army of Glory
 Central Division
 Sword of God Brigade
 Army of Islam
 Army of Victory
 Criterion Brigades (former)
 Conquest Brigade
 Liwa al-Haqq
 Jaysh al-Sunna
 Elite Islamic Battalions
 Islamic Freedom Brigade
 Dawn of Caliphate Battalions
 Bayan Movement
 16th Division (largely dissolved in July 2016, succeeded by 23rd Division)

War crimes

On 13 May 2016, Amnesty International accused the Fatah Halab coalition of "repeated indiscriminate attacks that may amount to war crimes". It also reported their alleged use of chemical weapons.

A United Nations report in February 2017 came to the conclusion that during the siege of Eastern Aleppo Fatah Halab, after vowing to take revenge on Kurds in Sheikh Maqsoud, intentionally attacked civilian inhabited neighbourhoods of the Kurdish enclave, killing and maiming dozens of civilians, and that these acts constitute the war crime of directing attacks against a civilian population.

See also
 List of armed groups in the Syrian Civil War

References

Sources
 

Anti-government factions of the Syrian civil war
Anti-ISIL factions in Syria
Operations rooms of the Syrian civil war
Aleppo Governorate in the Syrian civil war